Babakin is a small lunar impact crater that is located in the southern part of the walled basin Fermi on the far side of the Moon. The crater rim is symmetrical, circular and sharp-edged, with only some minor erosion and a slight depression along the northern edge. The interior walls slope downward gently toward the center.

References

External links
 
 LTO-101B4 Babakin — L&PI topographic map of crater and vicinity.

Impact craters on the Moon